Ji Liping (born December 9, 1988, Shanghai) is a Chinese swimmer.  She competed at the 2012 Summer Olympics, in the 200 m breaststroke and the 4 x 100 m medley relay.

See also
 China at the 2012 Summer Olympics#Swimming

References

External links
 
 Profile at gz2010.cn

Living people
1988 births
Chinese female breaststroke swimmers
Swimmers from Shanghai
World Aquatics Championships medalists in swimming
Olympic swimmers of China
Swimmers at the 2012 Summer Olympics
Medalists at the FINA World Swimming Championships (25 m)
Asian Games medalists in swimming
Swimmers at the 2006 Asian Games
Swimmers at the 2010 Asian Games
Asian Games gold medalists for China
Asian Games silver medalists for China
Asian Games bronze medalists for China
Medalists at the 2006 Asian Games
Medalists at the 2010 Asian Games
21st-century Chinese women